Gillian Welch (born October 2, 1967) is a singer-songwriter from Nashville, Tennessee. Welch plays with her music partner David Rawlings, whom she met while they were both students at The Berklee College of Music. The first two Gillian Welch albums were released through the label Almo Sounds. After Universal Music Group purchased Almo, Welch started her own label, Acony Records.

In her career, Welch has collaborated with several artists, appearing as a musician, songwriter, and vocalist.

The artist in all recordings is listed as "Gillian Welch" except where noted.

Studio albums

Live albums

Archival releases

Soundtracks

Tribute albums

Other appearances

Live compilations

DVD

Music videos

References
 GillianWelch.com – Discography

External links
 
 

Country music discographies
Discographies of American artists